McKelvey is a surname. Notable people with the surname include:

Andrew McKelvey (1934–2008), American businessman
Derek McKelvey (1934-2019), British rock climber
Frank McKelvey (1895–1974), Irish painter
Frank McKelvey Bell, Canadian soldier and writer
George McKelvey (lawman), constable of Charleston, Arizona Territory
George McKelvey (mayor), American politician
George McKelvey (soccer), American soccer player
Gerald McKelvey, American politician
Grant McKelvey, Scottish rugby union coach and player
Houston McKelvey (born 1942), Irish Anglican dean
J. J. McKelvey (born 1980), American football player
Jim McKelvey (born 1965), American computer scientist
Joan McKelvey, Canadian judge
Joe McKelvey (died 1922), Irish republican
John McKelvey (1847–1944), American baseball player
Miguel McKelvey (born 1973/74), American billionaire
Richard McKelvey (1944–2002), American political scientist
Rob McKelvey (born 1969), American golfer
Robert McKelvey, American football coach
Susan Delano McKelvey, American botanist (1883-1964)
Tara McKelvey, American journalist
Trish McKelvey (born 1942), New Zealand cricketer
Vincent Ellis McKelvey (1917–1987), American geologist
William McKelvey (born 1934), British politician